This a list of the 320 members of the 18th legislature of the Italian Senate. They were elected in the 2018 Italian general election and assumed office on 16 March 2018. The term will end in 2022.

Seat division

Bureau

Forza Italia-Union of the Centre

President 
 Anna Maria Bernini

Deputy Vice-President 
 Lucio Malan

Vice-Presidents 
 Adriano Galliani
 Maria Alessandra Gallone
 Gabriella Giammanco
 Massimo Mallegni
 Giuseppe Mangialavori
Giuseppe Moles
Maria Rizzotti
Licia Ronzulli

Treasurer 

 Gilberto Pichetto Fratin

Members 
Enrico Aimi
Elisabetta Casellati
Francesca Alderisi
Alberto Barachini
Antonio Barboni
Francesco Battistoni
Roberto Berardi
 Sandro Biasotti
 Paola Binetti
Giacomo Caliendo
Fulvia Michela Caligiuri
 Andrea Cangini
Luigi Cesaro
Stefania Craxi
 Franco Dal Mas
 Dario Damiani
 Antonio De Poli
 Domenico De Siano
 Claudio Fazzone
 Massimo Ferro
 Emilio Floris
 Maurizio Gasparri
 Francesco Maria Giro
 Barbara Masini
 Alfredo Messina
 Anna Carmela Minuto
 Fiammetta Modena
 Nazario Pagano
 Urania Papatheu
 Adriano Paroli
 Marco Perosino
 Antonio Saccone
 Renato Schifani
 Salvatore Sciascia
 Giancarlo Serafini
 Marco Siclari
 Laura Stabile
 Maria Virginia Tiraboschi
 Roberta Toffanin
Luigi Vitali

Brothers of Italy

President 

 Luca Ciriani

Deputy Vice-President 
 Isabella Rauti

Members 
 Antonio Balboni
Claudio Barbaro (from 12/09/2020)
Nicola Calandrini (from 03/20/2019)
 Andrea De Bertoldi
 Luca De Carlo (from 10/05/2020)
Tiziana Carmela Rosaria Drago (from 03/18/2021)
 Giovanbattista Fazzolari
Daniela Garnero Santanchè
 Antonio Iannone
 Patrizio Giacomo La Pietra
 Ignazio La Russa
 Gianpietro Maffoni (from 07/12/2018)
 Gaetano Nastri
 Giovanna Petrenga (from 97/02/2019)
 Massimo Ruspandini
 Achille Totaro
 Adolfo Urso
 Francesco Zaffini

Italia Viva-P.S.I.

President 

 Davide Faraone

Deputy Vice-President 

 Laura Garavini

Vice-President 

 Giuseppe Luigi Salvatore Cucca (from 11/09/2020)

Secretary 

 Daniela Sbrollini

Treasurer 

 Francesco Bonifazi

Members 

Teresa Bellanova
Vincenzo Carbone (from 07/01/2020)
 Donatella Conzatti
 Nadia Ginetti
 Leonardo Grimani
 Ernesto Magorno
 Mauro Maria Marino
Riccardo Nencini
 Annamaria Parente (from 10/07/2020)
 Matteo Renzi
 Valeria Sudano
 Gelsomina Vono

Lega Nord-Sardinian Action Party

President 
 Massimiliano Romeo

Deputy Vice-President 
 Paolo Tosato

Vice-Presidents 
 Antonella Faggi
 Enrico Montani
Maria Saponara

Secretary 

 Stefano Candiani

Treasurer 
 Stefano Borghesi

Members 
 Valeria Alessandrini (from 03/18/2020)
 Paolo Arrigoni
 Luigi Augussori
 Alberto Bagnai
 Giorgio Maria Bergesio
 Giulia Bongiorno
Stefano Borghesi
 Lucia Borgonzoni
 Simone Bossi
 Umberto Bossi
 Luca Briziarelli
 Francesco Bruzzone
 Roberto Calderoli
 Maurizio Campari
 Stefano Candiani
 Massimo Candura
 Maria Cristina Cantù
 Marzia Casolati
Gian Marco Centinaio
 Stefano Corti (from 07/31/2019)
 William De Vecchis
Carlo Doria (from 10/05/2020)
 Roberta Ferrero
 Sonia Fregolent
 Umberto Fusco
 Ugo Grassi (from 12/12/2019)
 Tony Iwobi
 Stefano Lucidi (from 12/12/2019)
 Michelina Lunesu (from 06/19/2019)
 Raffaella Fiormaria Marin
 Roberto Marti
Francesco Mollame (from 04/14/2021)
 Tiziana Nisini
 Andrea Ostellari
 Giuliano Pazzaglini
 Emanuele Pellegrini
 Pasquale Pepe
 Simona Pergreffi
 Cesare Pianasso
 Simone Pillon
 Daisy Pirovano
 Pietro Pisani
 Mario Pittoni
 Nadia Pizzol
 Stefania Pucciarelli
Alessandra Riccardi (from 06/23/2020)
 Paolo Ripamonti
 Erica Rivolta
 Gianfranco Rufa
 Matteo Salvini (from 07/31/2019)
 Paolo Saviane
 Rosellina Sbrana
 Armando Siri
Christian Solinas
 Erika Stefani
Elena Testor (from 06/03/2020)
 Francesco Urraro (from 12/12/2019)
 Gianpaolo Vallardi
 Manuel Vescovi
 Cristiano Zuliani

Five Star Movement

President 

 Ettore Licheri

Deputy Vice-President 

 Andrea Cioffi

Vice-Presidents 

 Maria Domenica Castellone
 Gianluca Ferrara
Arnaldo Lomuti
Agostino Santillo

Secretaries 

 Gabriele Lanzi
Emma Pavanelli
 Vincenzo Santangelo

Treasurer 

 Elisa Pirro

Members 

 Rossella Accoto
 Donatella Agostinelli
 Alberto Airola
 Cristiano Anastasi
 Giuseppe Auddino
 Laura Bottici
 Elena Botto
 Antonella Campagna
 Gianluca Castaldi (from 07/03/2018)
 Francesco Castiello
 Nunzia Catalfo
 Mauro Coltorti
 Gian Marco Corbetta
 Vito Claudio Crimi
 Marco Croatti
 Grazia D'Angelo
Danila De Lucia
 Gianmauro Dell'Olio
 Gabriella Di Girolamo
 Primo Di Nicola
 Stanislao Di Piazza
 Daniela Donno
 Giovanni Endrizzi
 Elvira Lucia Evangelista
 Giorgio Fede
Emiliano Fede
 Barbara Floridia
 Agnese Gallicchio
 Vincenzo Garruti
 Felicia Gaudiano
 Gianni Pietro Girotto
 Barbara Guidolin
 Patty L'Abbate
 Cinzia Leone
Pietro Lorefice
 Giulia Lupo
 Alessandra Maiorino
 Maria Laura Mantovani
 Gaspare Antonio Marinello
 Susy Matrisciano
 Raffaele Mautone
 Michela Montevecchi
 Gisella Naturale
 Simona Nunzia Nocerino
 Stefano Patuanelli
 Marco Pellegrini
Gianluca Perilli
 Daniele Pesco
 Vito Rosario Petrocelli
 Angela Anna Bruna Piarulli
 Giuseppe Pisani
 Vincenzo Presutto
 Sergio Puglia
 Ruggiero Quarto
 Sabrina Ricciardi
 Sergio Romagnoli
 Iunio Valerio Romano
 Loredana Russo
 Pierpaolo Sileri
 Paola Taverna
 Danilo Toninelli
 Fabrizio Trentacoste
 Mario Turco
 Sergio Vaccaro
 Orietta Vanin

Democratic Party

President 

 Simona Flavia Malpezzi

Deputy Vice-President 

 Alan Ferrari

Vice-Presidents 

 Caterina Biti
Franco Mirabelli

Secretaries 

 Monica Cirinnà
Vincenzo D'Arienzo

Treasurer 

 Stefano Collina

Members 

 Alessandro Alfieri
 Bruno Astorre
 Caterina Bini
 Paola Boldrini
 Tommaso Cerno
Eugenio Comincini (from 03/22/2021)
 Luciano D'Alfonso
 Valeria Fedeli
 Andrea Ferrazzi
 Francesco Giacobbe
 Vanna Iori
 Mauro Laus
 Daniele Manca
Andrea Marcucci
 Salvatore Margiotta
Gianni Marilotti (from 04/15/2021)
 Assuntela Messina
 Antonio Misiani
 Tommaso Nannicini
 Dario Parrini
 Roberta Pinotti
 Gianni Pittella
 Roberto Rampi
 Tatjana Rojc (from 03/30/2021)
 Anna Rossomando
Dario Stefano
 Mino Taricco
 Valeria Valente
 Vito Vattuone
 Francesco Verducci
 Luigi Zanda

For the Autonomies (SVP-PATT, UV)

President 

 Julia Unterberger

Deputy Vice-President 

 Dieter Steger

Vice-President 

 Albert Lanièce

Secretary 

 Albert Lanièce

Treasurer 

 Meinhard Durnwalder

Members 

 Gianclaudio Bressa
 Pier Ferdinando Casini
 Elena Cattaneo (senator for life)
 Giorgio Napolitano (senator for life)

Mixed

President 

 Loredana De Petris (LeU-Eco)

Treasurer 

 Emma Bonino (+Eu-Az)

Members 

 Rosa Silvana Abate (from 02/19/2021)
Luisa Angrisani (from 02/19/2021)
Massimo Vittorio Berutti (IeC) (from 07/22/2020)
Maurizio Buccarella (LeU-Eco) (from 03/30/2021)
Adriano Cairo (MAIE) (from 03/30/2021)
Andrea Causin (from 03/30/2021)
Lello Ciampolillo (from 02/05/2020)
Margherita Corrado (from 02/19/2020)
Mattia Crucioli (from 02/19/2020)
Saverio De Bonis (from 03/30/2021)
Gregorio de Falco (from 03/30/2021)
Emanuele Dessì (from 02/25/2021)
Luigi Di Marzio (from 01/16/2020)
Fabio Di Micco (from 02/19/2021)
 Vasco Errani (LeU-Eco)
Raffaele Fantetti (IeC) (from 03/30/2021)
Elena Fattori (from 11/06/2019)
Silvana Giannuzzi (from 02/19/2021)
Mario Michele Giarrusso (from 04/24/2020)
Bianca Laura Granato (from 02/19/2021)
 Pietro Grasso (LeU-Eco)
Virginia La Mura (from 02/19/2021)
 Francesco Laforgia (LeU-Eco)
Elio Lannutti (from 02/19/2021)
Barbara Lezzi (from 02/19/2021)
Alessandrina Lonardo (from 07/29/2020)
Matteo Mantero (from 02/19/2021)
Carlo Martelli
Ricardo Antonio Merlo (MAIE) (from 03/29/2021)
Cataldo Mininno (from 02/19/2021)
Mario Monti (senator for life)
Vilma Moronese (from 02/19/2021)
Nicola Morra (from 02/19/2021)
 Paola Nugnes (from 06/29/2019)
Fabrizio Ortis (from 02/19/2021)
Marinella Pacifico (IeC) (from 10/21/2020)
 Gianluigi Paragone (from 10/21/2020)
Gaetano Quagliariello (IeC) (from 07/22/2020)
 Matteo Richetti (+Eu-Az) (from 09/11/2019)
 Paolo Romani (IeC) (from 07/22/2020)
Mariarosaria Rossi (IeC) (from 03/30/2021)
Sandro Ruotolo (LeU-Eco) (from 03/05/2020)
 Liliana Segre (senator for life)

Senators for life non-inscrited 

 Renzo Piano
 Carlo Rubbia

References

External links 

 Complete list of senators

Members of the Senate of the Republic (Italy)
Senators of Legislature XVIII of Italy